Gillies MacKinnon (born 8 January 1948, Glasgow) is a Scottish film director, writer and painter. He attended the Glasgow School of Art where he studied mural painting. Following this he became an art teacher and cartoonist, and about this time he traveled with a nomadic tribe in the Sahara for six months. 

In the 1970s he studied at the Middlesex Polytechnic and in the 1980s in the National Film and Television School. He made a short film called Passing Glory as his graduation piece, a  recreation of Glasgow in the 1950s and 1960s. It was premiered at the 1986 Edinburgh International Film Festival, where it won the first Scottish Film Prize.

Filmography
Conquest of the South Pole (1989) (TV film, adapted from the play by Manfred Karge)
The Grass Arena (1991)
The Playboys (1992)
The Young Indiana Jones Chronicles (1992) (TV series)
A Simple Twist of Fate (1994)
Small Faces (1996) co-writer and director
Trojan Eddie (1996)
Regeneration (1997)
Hideous Kinky (1998)
The Last of the Blonde Bombshells (2000)
The Escapist (2002)
Pure (2002)
Gunpowder, Treason & Plot (2004)
Tara Road (2005)
Castles in the Sky (2014)
Whisky Galore! (2016)
Torvill & Dean (2018) (TV film)
The Last Bus (2021)

References

External links
gilliesmackinnon.co.uk Official website

 
 :es:La última de las Bombshells Rubias

1948 births
Living people
Scottish film directors
Scottish screenwriters
Film people from Glasgow
Alumni of the National Film and Television School
Alumni of the Glasgow School of Art
Alumni of Middlesex University